The Alejandro sniper rifle is a bolt-action sniper rifle which was designed and manufactured in Cuba by the Unión de Industrias Militares.

It was named after the code name used by Fidel Castro in the Sierra Maestra, which was also his middle name.

Design
The Alejandro is a bolt-action precision rifle used by all branches of the Cuban Armed Forces. Its design started towards the end of 2001 and the beginning of 2002, and it fires the 7.62×54mmR cartridge fed from an internal magazine with a capacity of 8 rounds.

Although it can use different types of scopes, even Western ones, its standard is the PSO-1.

References

7.62×54mmR rifles
Sniper rifles
Military equipment of Cuba